WNUC-LP (96.7 FM) is a community radio station in Detroit, Michigan, having launched in 2016 as a grassroots affiliate of Pacifica Radio. The station covers the immediate New Center neighborhood, and from Downtown Detroit to North End. Its format is a mixture of Urban Gospel and community talk radio.

Due to its proximity and frequency, the station is subject to interference from nearby CHYR-FM in Leamington, Ontario, which broadcasts at a substantially higher power (10 kW).

See also
List of community radio stations in the United States

External links
 Official website
 Facebook page
 North End Woodward Community Coalition - Owners of the station

NUC-LP
Radio stations established in 2017
2017 establishments in Michigan
NUC-LP
Community radio stations in the United States